Hugard is a French family name:
Pierre Hugard (1726–1761), French composer
Jean Hugard (1871–1959), stagename of Australian magician

References

French-language surnames